Eleanor Marion Bennett (born 4 February 1942) (née Scrymgeour) is an Australian botanist who was employed by the Western Australian Herbarium from 1965 to 1970. She collected Eucalyptus species in the south-west of Western Australia and published a revision of the genus Hybanthus in 1972. She is the author of two books: Bushland Plants of Kings Park, Western Australia and Common and aboriginal names of Western Australian plant species. Bennett was also one of the authors of Flora of the Perth region.

References

1942 births
20th-century Australian botanists
Botanists active in Australia
Botanists with author abbreviations
Women botanists
20th-century Australian women scientists
Living people